A Word Sum Puzzle (also known as WSP) is a word game that requires simple mathematical operations, and vocabulary skills to be solved. The solution is always a single word that contains four or more letters.

A WSP has a clue and two or more hints, where the clue is a meaning for the solution (a single word) and each hint gives the sum of the numbers assigned to the first two, four, etc. letters of the solution[1]. In an English WSP, the numbers assigned to the letters are as the same of their orders in English alphabet:

A, a = 1
B, b = 2
C, c = 3
D, d = 4
...
Z, z = 26

Example

A curved part of a path:
_ _ (7)
_ _ _ _ (25)

The first line of the puzzle presents a clue; in this puzzle, "A curved part of a path" is the puzzle's clue. The other lines of the puzzle are its hints. This puzzle has two hints:

FIRST HINT
_ _ (7)

This hint indicates that the first two letters of the answer make a sum of 7. Hence, the first two letters can be:
A & F (or F & A), B & E, C & D or D & C

SECOND HINT
_ _ _ _ (25)

This hint indicates that the first four letters of the answer make a sum of 25. But based on the first hint, it is already known that the first two letters made a 7, therefore the third and fourth letters make a sum of 18. So they can be:
A& Q, B & P, C & O, D & N, E & M, ... I & I

To solve the puzzle, the player should find which two pairs of letters obtained from these hints can make a word that means “A curved part of a path”.

A & F + A & Q – (NO)
A & F + B & P – (NO)
...
B & E + D & N (YES)
The solution for this example is "bend".

References

1. G.R. Worder, Word Sum Puzzles, 2010

Word puzzles